is a Japanese rapper, singer, actor, dancer, and a member of the J-pop group AAA. He is the rapper of the group and also writes rap lyrics for the band. He is also a member of the hip hop trio Mother Ninjas. He also debuted as a solo artist in August 2013 as Sky-Hi.

Discography

Albums

Studio albums

Compilation albums

Singles

Notes

References

External links
  

1986 births
AAA (band) members
Actors from Chiba Prefecture
Avex Group artists
Japanese male actors
Japanese male pop singers
Japanese rappers
Living people
Musicians from Chiba Prefecture
People from Chiba (city)